"Five Little Speckled Frogs" is a nursery rhyme that originated in the United States; the original author is unknown. 

This song is meant to teach children subtraction, in this case by describing frogs jumping off of a log into a pool, one by one.

Lyrics 

One version of the song is:

Alternate versions 
Alternate versions of the song use other sorts of insects or animals instead of frogs, although none of these songs seem to be as common.

Hand motions 
There are hand motions children may use to participate during the song.
 Line #1: By show of fingers, hold up the number of frogs sitting on the log.
 Line #2: Draw in your hands close to your chest and curl your fingers downward, facing the floor as though you are a frog perched atop a log.
 Line #3: Mimic eating while you sing 'Eating some most delicious bugs', then rub your belly delightfully while singing 'yum, yum!'.
 Line #4: Hold one finger up to represent the frog who fell off the log.
 Line #5: Pretend to fall over.
 Line #6: By a show of fingers, hold up the number of frogs still remaining on the log while singing "Now there are four little speckled frogs". Upon singing "(glub, glub)", repeat the same movement as in the second line except look upward as though you were a frog underneath water.

In Popular Culture 

The band DragonForce's song Heart of a Dragon's melody is essentially the same as the melody of this song.

References

External links 
 

English children's songs
Songs about amphibians
Nursery rhymes of uncertain origin